Tuvia Tenenbom (born 1957 in Bnei Brak, Israel) is a theater director, playwright, author, journalist, essayist and the founding artistic director of the Jewish Theater of New York, the only English-speaking Jewish theater in New York City. Tenenbom was called the "founder of a new form of Jewish theatre" by the French Le Monde and a "New Jew" by the Israeli Maariv. 
Tenenbom is also an academic, having university degrees in mathematics, computer science, dramatic writing and literature.

Dramatic works
Tenenbom has written over sixteen plays for The Jewish Theater of New York. German newspaper Die Zeit described Tenenbom's play The Last Virgin as "more desperately needed in Germany than suspected"; The New York Times, reviewing Father of the Angels, called it "irresistibly fascinating"; and Corriere della Sera, reviewing Last Jew In Europe, named Tenenbom "One of the most iconoclastic and innovative of contemporary dramatists."

Political essays and other writing
Tenenbom writes for many newspapers and websites, and his political articles, cultural criticism and essays have appeared in media outlets including Die Zeit of Germany, Corriere della Sera of Italy, Yedioth Ahronot of Israel and Fox News. Tuvia Tenenbom was also a political columnist for Zeit Online; his column appeared every second week. He is a frequent contributor for Die Zeit.

I Sleep in Hitler's Room
Tenenbom's book I Sleep in Hitler's Room, published by an imprint of The Jewish Theater of New York, is a psychological travelogue through present-day Germany. Described by the Israeli paper Haaretz as an "alarming account of anti-Semitism," the book details the wide spread of modern anti-Semitism in Europe. "Tuvia Tenenbom comes off as a Jewish Hunter S. Thompson," said David P. Goldman (under the pseudonym Spengler) of the Asia Times in his review of the book, adding, "To understand Germans, one has to learn their language and live with them – or read Tenenbom's book." Bruce Bawer, reviewing it for PJ Media, writes: "It's a book in a category all its own — deeply sobering, depressing even, in its observations of the darker side of Germany, yet at the same time so chatty and engaging and laugh-out-loud funny that it's hard to put down." The book also received strong endorsement from the National Review, which called it "a tremendous book."

In December 2012, a German translation of Tenenbom's book titled Allein unter Deutschen (Alone Among Germans), published by Suhrkamp Verlag of Berlin, became an instant bestseller on the Spiegel bestseller list. Upon publication in Germany, book critics differed widely in their opinions of the work. Spiegel'''s Wolfgang Höbel and Jakob Augstein were highly critical of the book. Die Tageszeitung (taz) was extremely critical, writing that Tenenbom's book offered "zero insight", while Jungle World  called the book "a gem." The German-Jewish journalist Henryk M. Broder praised Tenenbom's "one-sidedness," comparing him to both Michael Moore and to Sacha Baron Cohen's Borat. German TV station WDR, which Tenenbom accused in his book of assisting an anti-Semitic group in Cologne, dismissed the book as "embarrassing or dumb". Deutschlandfunk advised its listeners not to buy the book and encouraged those who had already bought it to bring it back to the bookstore. Evelyn Finger of Die Zeit  praised the book, calling it "courageous" and describing its content as a "Kamikaze ride of discovery into Germany's national character." In Germany's Jewish weekly  Jüdische Allgemeine, which is published by the Jewish community of Germany, Hannes Stein endorsed Tenenbom's book and findings: "This book contains the bitter nectar of the pure, unfiltered truth."

Catch the Jew!
Tenenbom's book Catch the Jew!, published by Gefen Publishing recounts the adventures of Tuvia Tenenbom, who wanders around Israel of our time calling himself "Tobi the German."

In the course of numerous interviews Tuvia extracts information, sentiments, hidden theories and delusional visions motivating the miscellany of peoples forming the present-day Holy Land. The Wall Street Journal hailed the book, writing: "Catch the Jew! offers one of the more interesting portraits of Palestinian politics to have appeared in English," and concluding that "no reader of Catch the Jew! can come away having failed to learn many new things about Israelis and Palestinians, two peoples we talk about so much but understand so little."

A reviewer for Publishers Weekly writes that Tenenbom's "riveting tale, chock full of unbelievable and hilarious encounters, is highly engaging and emotional, eminently readable, brutally honest, and likely the most uncensored and eye-opening report readers will see."Catch the Jew! was published in Israel in September 2014 by Sela Meir publishers and became an instant best seller in Israel, reaching the  1 spot on Haaretz, Steimatzky and Yedioth Ahronot best-seller lists, winning major praise by Israeli critics. Mida called Tenenbom "the ultimate leftist and humanist who loves all people, is everything the left pretends to be but is not," while Channel 2 TV named it "the most important book in the last five years," and Haaretz advised its readers to "read Tenenbom's book; we don't have the luxury not to know what he's telling us." In Germany, the book came out in November 2014 by the publishing house of Suhrkamp under the title "Allein unter Juden" (Alone Among Jews) and immediately became a Spiegel Best Seller.

The book earned major endorsements by German critics. Spiegel Online said: "You need to have curiosity in you and a fearlessness of thought to view the Middle East story differently, a curiosity and a fearlessness that Tuvia Tenenbom has," and Die Welt called it, "The finest book on the Middle East saga."

 The Lies They Tell 
In October 2016 Tenenbom's third book, Allein unter Amerikanern was published by Suhrkamp Verlag in Berlin, Germany, where it became a Der Spiegel bestseller. In March 2017 it was published in English by Gefen Publishing. Tuvia Tenenbom travels through America to find out who are the Americans, the people who make up America.
A contributor to Publishers Weekly wrote: "Brutal, irreverent, and cutting, Tenenbom’s riveting book aims to disrupt American complacency."

Hello, Refugees!
Tenenbom's fourth book, Hello, Refugees! came out in English in July 2017, following its publication in German by Suhrkamp Verlag in March 2017, under the title Allein unter Flüchtlingen. In Hello, Refugees! Tenenbom chronicles his visits to many refugee camps in Germany, reporting of horrific conditions in most of those camps. Additionally, Hello, Refugees! contains interviews with politicians and activists from the far-right to the far-left, whom he asked to explain to him why has Germany taken in more refugees than other European countries. The Jerusalem Post called the book "a gem," and Asia Times said that "If Kafka had written non-fiction, he could not have bested Tenenbom’s latest book."

 The Taming of the Jew 
Tenenbom's fifth book, The Taming of the Jew, came out in English in February 2021, following its publication in Germany in February 2020, under the title Allein unter Briten. In The Taming of the Jew, Tenenbom chronicles the rise of anti-Semitism in the UK and the Jewish community's reluctance to effectively deal with it. David Herman, reviewing the book for the British The Article, writes: "This is a frightening book and deserves to be read." In his review for the American Algemeiner'', David Goldman writes that the book "is quizzical and tragic at the same time, the sort of comedy sketches that Samuel Beckett might have written if he were Jewish rather than Irish."

External links
 Video interview with Tenenbom

References

1957 births
Living people
Israeli theatre directors
Israeli emigrants to the United States
American theatre directors
People from Bnei Brak
Jewish theatre directors
Jewish dramatists and playwrights
20th-century Israeli dramatists and playwrights
21st-century Israeli dramatists and playwrights
21st-century Israeli male writers
21st-century Israeli non-fiction writers
Jewish Israeli writers
20th-century Israeli Jews
21st-century Israeli Jews
Jewish American non-fiction writers
21st-century travel writers
Writers on antisemitism